The 2018–19 Pakistan Premier League was the 61st season of Pakistan domestic football and the 12th season of the Pakistan Premier League, and the first season to be played since 2014–15.

The season is scheduled to be held in Multan, Karachi and Lahore between 25 September and 11 January 2019, with 16 teams participating (12 PPL teams and 4 winner teams of second-tier playoffs).

Each team would get to play each other twice, meaning in a season they would play 30 games. The bottom four teams get relegated to the second tier. The team that finishes first would get qualification in the AFC Cup, but AFC denied entry of Pakistani football clubs in 2019 AFC Cup because of incomplete licensing regulations due to absence of footballing activity since the end of 2014-15 season.

Teams

Promotion and relegation

Teams relegated to FFL
Baloch Quetta and Pakistan Railways were relegated at the end of 2014–15 season (no league was held until current season).

Teams promoted from FFL
Pakistan Navy got promoted after winning 2014–15 Pakistan Football Federation League, defeating Baloch Nushki 1–0 in the finals.

Teams promoted from PPL Promotion Play-Offs 2018 

Civil Aviation Authority, Sui Southern Gas Company, Ashraf Sugar Mills and Sui Nouthern Gas Company won their matches and promoted to Pakistan Premier League.

Stadium and locations

Season summary
Ashraf Sugar Mills and Pakistan Airlines withdrew from league with former withdrawing after playing first phase in Multan and latter not playing a single match due to financial issues. Baloch Nushki got relegated after failing to win a single match and ended third last in relegation zone with six points from 6 draws. On 9 January 2019, Karachi Port Trust got relegated to Federation League for the first time ever, after they lost 2–0 to Muslim and 12th placed Sui Northern Gas winning their game match 4–3 against Afghan Chaman, leaving Karachi Port Trust 5 points from safe zone with only one match to play.
Khan Research Laboratories won the league on the final match day. Pakistan Airforce were sitting at the top of table with 51 points, one point ahead of Sui Southern Gas and three ahead of Khan Research Laboratories, who both had to face each other on final match day. Sui Southern Gas victory would hand them the title and for Khan Research Laboratories, they to beat the Sui Southern Gas by four goals to secure the title. Khan Research Laboratories the last game of the season, defeating title contenders Sui Southern Gas 4–0, finishing first on goal difference ahead of Pakistan Airforce. This is the smallest title winning margin in the history of Pakistan Premier League, with Khan Research Laboratories winning with a goal difference of just +1, as Pakistan Airforce had a goal difference on +27 and winners Khan Research Laboratories had +28.

League table

Results

Season statistics

Scoring 
 First goal of the season: Ahmed Faheem for WAPDA against Pakistan Army (26 September 2018).
 Last goal of the season: Izharullah for Khan Research Laboratories against Sui Southern Gas (13 January 2018)
 Most goals scored by a single team in a match: 6 goals
 Pakistan Navy 6–1 Baloch Nushki (7 December 2018)
 Highest scoring game: 7 goals
 Pakistan Navy 6–1 Baloch Nushki (7 December 2018)
 Karachi Port Trust 2–5 Civil Aviation Authority (30 December 2018)
 Sui Northern Gas 4–3 Afghan Chaman (8 January 2019)
 Most goals scored in a match by a losing team: 3 goals
 Sui Northern Gas 4–3 Afghan Chaman (8 January 2019)

Top scorers

Hat-tricks 

4 Player scored four goals

References

Pakistan Premier League seasons
1
Pakistan